= Eastern Orthodox calendar =

Eastern Orthodox calendar may refer to:

- Eastern Orthodox liturgical year
- Julian calendar (sometimes referred to as the "Old Calendar")
- Revised Julian calendar, a quasi-Gregorian 1923 scheme (sometimes referred to as the "New Calendar")
